The Asia/Oceania Zone is one of three zones of regional competition in the 2020–21 Billie Jean King Cup.

Group I 
 Venue: Aviation Club Tennis Centre, Dubai, United Arab Emirates (hard)
 Date: 3–7 March 2020

The six teams competed in one pool, with the teams finishing 1st and 2nd place in the pool advancing to the play-offs. The nations finishing 5th and 6th in the pool were relegated to Group II for 2022. The event was moved and postponed a month from Dongguan, China to Dubai due to the COVID-19 pandemic.

Seeding

 1Billie Jean King Cup Rankings as of 11 November 2019

Pool 

Group II 
 Venue 1: Renouf Tennis Centre, Wellington, New Zealand (hard) 
 Venue 2: Sri Lanka Tennis Association Complex, Colombo, Sri Lanka (clay)
 Dates: 4–8 February 2020 (Wellington) 

The eighteen teams will compete across two different venues, with 10 nations taking part in Colombo, and 8 nations taking part in Wellington. In Colombo, ten teams will compete across 2 pools (Pools A & B). The winners of each pool will play-off to determine which nation will advance to Asia/Oceania Group I in 2022. In Wellington, eight teams will compete across two Pools of 4 teams (Pools A & B). The winners of each pool will play-off to determine which nation will advance to Asia/Oceania Group I in 2022.

Due to COVID-19 restrictions, the event in Sri Lanka could not be held. The Billie Jean King Cup committee has decided that in light of the challenges of identifying and appointing a new host nation during the remainder of the 2021 tennis season, the event will no longer take place in 2021. The seven competing nations, Hong Kong China, Iran, Malaysia, Oman, Sri Lanka, Tajikistan and Vietnam, will remain in Asia/Oceania Group II, where they will compete in the 2022 competition.

Seeding
Wellington

 1Billie Jean King Cup Rankings as of 11 November 2019

Pools

Play-offs

Final placements 

  was promoted to Asia/Oceania Zone Group I in 2022.

References 

 Billie Jean King Cup Result, 2020 Asia/Oceania Group I
 Billie Jean King Cup Result, 2020 Asia/Oceania Group II

External links 
 Billie Jean King Cup website

 
Asia Oceania
Tennis tournaments in the United Arab Emirates
Tennis tournaments in New Zealand
Tennis tournaments in Sri Lanka
Billie Jean King Cup Asia Oceania Zone
Billie Jean King Cup Asia Oceania Zone
Billie Jean King Cup Asia Oceania Zone
2020 in Emirati tennis
2020 in New Zealand tennis
2020 in Sri Lankan sport